Begowala is a town of Sialkot District  in the Punjab province of Pakistan. It is located in the centre of the Sialkot-Sambrial road and lies 10 km away from Sambrial. Begowala is cold during winters and hot and humid during summers. May and June are the hottest months. The temperature during winter may drop  to 0°C. The land is, generally, plain and fertile. Most of the rain falls during the Monsoon season in summer which often  results in flooding.

Images

References

External links
 Begowala Village

Villages in Sialkot District